Dhanashree is a raga. It prominently appears in the Sikh tradition from northern India and is part of the Guru Granth Sahib.

Raga Dhanashree appears in the Ragmala as a ragini of Malkauns and currently is a member of the Kafi thaat. It closely resembles Bhimpalasi in musical content but the vadis and moods are different (Described Below). Dhanashree is performed in the early afternoon and presents a cheerful, happy mood. It provided the setting for hymns by Guru Nanak, Guru Amar Das, Guru Ram Das, Guru Arjan and Guru Tegh Bahadar for a total of 101 hymns.

The following represents the order of notes that can be used on the ascending and descending phase of the composition and the primary and secondary notes:

 Aroh: ni Sa ga Ma Pa ni Sa
 Avroh: Sa ni Dha Pa Ma Pa ga Re Sa
 Vadi: Sa
 Samvadi: Pa
 Jaati : Audava – sampurana
 samay :  Third pehar of the day
 Thaat : Kafi

This Raag is almost exactly the same as the Classical Raga Bhimpalasi, only that the Vadi/Samvadi are switched. So in Bhimpalasi, the Vadi is Ma and Samvadi is Sa.

Pa is given considerable emphasis and Ni and Pa receive sliding approaches, a characteristic of this raga.  The pentatonic ascent provides some of the melodic features of this raga.

The Carnatic Equivalent of this raga is Abheri

See also 
 Kirtan

References

External links 
 Sikh Kirtan Community
 Gurmat Sangeet Project
 Raj Academy of Asian Music
 Sikhnet: Shabad for Printing
 

Hindustani ragas
Ragas in the Guru Granth Sahib